Omphax is a genus of moths in the family Geometridae erected by Achille Guenée in 1858.

Species
Some species of this genus are:
Omphax bara Herbulot, 1972 
Omphax interfulgens Herbulot, 1954 
Omphax neglecta Herbulot, 1977
Omphax plantaria Guenée, 1858

References

Geometrinae
Geometridae genera